Laura Boyd (born June 5, 1949) is an American politician from Oklahoma. A member of the Democratic Party, Boyd was elected in 1992 to the Oklahoma House of Representatives to represent District 44, which included Cleveland County. She served in the State House for six years until 1998 when she became the first woman to receive a major party nomination for Governor of Oklahoma. Incumbent Republican Governor Frank Keating defeated Boyd in a landslide. Eisenhower Fellowships selected Laura Boyd as a USA Eisenhower Fellow in 1999.

Biography
Boyd was born in Charlottesville, Virginia. She earned a bachelor's degree from Duke University, a master's from Marywood University, and a PhD in Psychology from American Commonwealth University. Boyd served in the Oklahoma House of Representatives from 1993 to 1998 and chaired the Community and Family Responsibilities Committee. She introduced 11 bills while in the House, three of which were signed into law. Boyd sponsored legislation to help create jobs in Oklahoma, to crack down on elder abuse, and to establish the College Savings Plan.

In 1998 Boyd became the first woman to be nominated for Governor of Oklahoma when she won the nomination of the Oklahoma Democratic Party. She received 41% of the votes and was defeated by Republican Frank Keating. In 2002 Boyd was the Democratic nominee for Lieutenant Governor of Oklahoma but was defeated by Republican Mary Fallin.

Boyd has taught at both the undergraduate and graduate levels. She has offered private counseling for over 20 years.

She is owner and CEO of Policy and Performance Consultants Inc. in Norman, as well as national field director of Women Legislators' Lobby and executive director of the Oklahoma Therapeutic Foster Care Association.

In 2011 she was inducted into the Oklahoma Women's Hall of Fame.

Major legislation
The Ryan Luke Act, which cracks down on child abuse and sexual predators, was Boyd's major legislative contribution.

References

External links
 2005-2006 Oklahoma Almanac Online--Oklahoma History 
 Women of the Oklahoma Legislature Oral History Project--OSU Library
 Historic House Membership Oklahoma House of Representatives.

|-

1949 births
20th-century American politicians
20th-century American women politicians
21st-century American politicians
21st-century American women politicians
Candidates in the 1998 United States elections
Candidates in the 2002 United States elections
Duke University alumni
Living people
Marywood University alumni
20th-century Members of the Oklahoma House of Representatives
Democratic Party members of the Oklahoma House of Representatives
Politicians from Charlottesville, Virginia
Women state legislators in Oklahoma